Ousman Koli (born 18 October 1988) is a Gambian footballer who plays as a defender for IB 1975 Ljubljana.

Club career
Born in Bakau, Koli began his career in 2001 with Bakau United and joined their league rivals Steve Biko FC in 2003.

In August 2011, he signed a contract with Slovenian second tier side Šenčur.

In February 2012, Koli joined Slovenian top flight team Triglav Kranj.

International career
Koli was a member of the Gambia under-17 team that won the 22 July Peace Tournament, held in Banjul in 2003. He was also included in the squad that won the first-ever international trophy for Gambia, when the team hosted and won the 2005 African U-17 Championship.

He debuted for the senior team in 2007 in a match against Guinea.

References

External links

Ousman Koli at PrvaLiga 
Ousman Koli at lagstatistik.se 

1988 births
Living people
People from Bakau
Gambian footballers
Association football defenders
Association football midfielders
The Gambia youth international footballers
The Gambia international footballers
Red Star F.C. players
NK Radomlje players
NK Triglav Kranj players
NK Ankaran players
Mosta F.C. players
FK Mladost Doboj Kakanj players
NK IB 1975 Ljubljana players
Slovenian Second League players
Slovenian PrvaLiga players
Maltese Premier League players
Gambian expatriate footballers
Expatriate footballers in France
Gambian expatriate sportspeople in France
Expatriate footballers in Slovenia
Expatriate footballers in Bangladesh
Gambian expatriate sportspeople in Bangladesh
Expatriate footballers in Malta
Expatriate footballers in Bosnia and Herzegovina
Expatriate footballers in Sweden
Gambian expatriate sportspeople in Sweden